Centrale is one of Togo's five regions. Sokodé is the regional capital. Centrale is the least  populated region in Togo with a total of 617,871 people according to a census done in 2010.

Other major cities in the Centrale region include Tchamba and Sotouboua.

Centrale is divided into the prefectures of Blitta, Subprefecture Mö, Sotouboua, Tchamba, and Tchaoudjo.

Centrale is located north of Plateaux Region and south of Kara Region.  Like the rest of the regions of Togo, it borders Ghana in the west and Benin in the east — specifically the Northern Region in the northwest and the Volta Region in the southwest, and the Donga Department in the northeast and the Collines Department in the southeast.

See also
 Regions of Togo

References 

 
Centrale Region